This article is about the particular significance of the year 1916 to Wales and its people.

Incumbents

Archdruid of the National Eisteddfod of Wales – Dyfed
Lord Lieutenant of Anglesey – Sir Richard Henry Williams-Bulkeley, 12th Baronet  
Lord Lieutenant of Brecknockshire – Joseph Bailey, 2nd Baron Glanusk
Lord Lieutenant of Caernarvonshire – John Ernest Greaves
Lord Lieutenant of Cardiganshire – Herbert Davies-Evans
Lord Lieutenant of Carmarthenshire – John William Gwynne Hughes 
Lord Lieutenant of Denbighshire – William Cornwallis-West    
Lord Lieutenant of Flintshire – Henry Gladstone, later Baron Gladstone
Lord Lieutenant of Glamorgan – Robert Windsor-Clive, 1st Earl of Plymouth
Lord Lieutenant of Merionethshire – Sir Osmond Williams, 1st Baronet
Lord Lieutenant of Monmouthshire – Ivor Herbert, 1st Baron Treowen
Lord Lieutenant of Montgomeryshire – Sir Herbert Williams-Wynn, 7th Baronet 
Lord Lieutenant of Pembrokeshire – John Philipps, 1st Viscount St Davids 
Lord Lieutenant of Radnorshire – Powlett Milbank
Bishop of Bangor – Watkin Williams 
Bishop of Llandaff – Joshua Pritchard Hughes
Bishop of St Asaph – A. G. Edwards (later Archbishop of Wales) 
Bishop of St Davids – John Owen

Events
1 January
The Port Eynon life-boat capsizes and three crew members die.
The Royal laryngologist John Milsom Rees is knighted.
8 January – The Apostolic Church in Wales is established.
2 February – Submarine  is launched at Pembroke Dock.
7 February – The Roman Catholic archdiocese of Cardiff is established.
1 March – Transfer of the National Library of Wales at Aberystwyth into its purpose-built premises is completed.
3 March – Light cruiser HMS Cambrian is launched at Pembroke Dock.
31 May–1 June – Hugh Evan-Thomas distinguishes himself in the Battle of Jutland; he is later knighted.
1 June – Miners' wages in the South Wales Coalfield are increased by 15%.
11 June – Frongoch internment camp is used as a place of imprisonment for approximately 1,800 Irishmen involved with the Easter Rising.
4 July – Royal Welch Fusiliers Lieutenant Siegfried Sassoon attacks a German trench single-handed, and records the outcome in his memoirs.
7–12 July – The 38th (Welsh) Division loses so many men in the Mametz Wood engagement during the Battle of the Somme that it is unable to re-group for a year.
12 July – Railway worker James Dally is awarded the Edward Medal by King George V for his actions in saving a colleague from falling from the Crumlin Viaduct.
July – Jimmy Thomas becomes General Secretary of the National Union of Railwaymen, which he had been instrumental in forming.
October – T. E. Lawrence is sent into the desert to report on the Arab nationalist movements.
7 November – Charles Evans Hughes loses narrowly to Woodrow Wilson in the United States presidential election.
November – Christopher Williams visits the scene of the Welsh losses at Mametz Wood and later paints his famous The Welsh at Mametz Wood at the request of David Lloyd George.
1 December – Government takes control of mines in the South Wales Coalfield.
2 December – Miners' wages in the South Wales Coalfield are again increased by 15%.
7 December
David Lloyd George is the first (and, as of a century later, only) Welshman to become Prime Minister of the United Kingdom.
David Alfred Thomas is created Baron Rhondda. He is appointed President of the Local Government Board.

Awards
National Eisteddfod of Wales (held in Aberystwyth) 
Chair - J. Ellis Williams, "Ystrad Fflur"
Crown - withheld

New books
Llewelyn Powys and John Cowper Powys - Confessions of Two Brothers  
Richard Hughes Williams (Dic Tryfan) - Tair Stori Fer

Film
22 April – Edmund Gwenn makes his screen debut in The Real Thing at Last.

Sport
Boxing: 14 February – Jimmy Wilde wins the British flyweight title at Liverpool.

Births
26 February - Joan Strothers (later Lady Curran), scientist (died 1999)
2 March - Eddie Watkins, rugby player (died 1995)
29 April - William Squire, actor (died 1989)
1 May - Glenn Ford, Welsh-Canadian actor (died 2006)
6 May - Ted Peterson, British baseball player (died 2005)
7 May - Huw Wheldon, broadcaster (died 1986)
8 May - Sylvia Sleigh, painter (died 2010)
22 May - Rupert Davies, actor (died 1976)
3 July - Nigel Heseltine, writer (died 1995)
23 August - Willie Davies, Wales international rugby union and league player (died 2002)
29 August - Rhydwen Williams, poet, novelist and minister (died 1997)
13 September - Roald Dahl, novelist (died 1990) 
14 September - Cledwyn Hughes, politician (died 2001)
24 September - W. J. Gruffydd (Elerydd), poet and Archdruid (died 2011)
31 October - Stan Trick, cricketer (died 1995)

Deaths
12 March - Llywarch Reynolds, solicitor and Celtic scholar, 72
14 March - Lou Phillips, Wales international rugby player, 38 (killed in action)
18 March - David Cuthbert Thomas ("Dick Tiltwood"), soldier, 21 (killed in action)
14 April - Charlie Pritchard, Wales international rugby player, 32 (killed in action)
May - John Griffiths, mathematician, 79
5 June - James Williams, footballer, 32 (killed in action)
26 June - Henry Allan Rolls, younger brother and heir presumptive of 2nd Baron Llangattock, 44
27 June - Sarah Jane Rees (Cranogwen), writer and temperance activist, 78
7 July - Dick Thomas, Wales international rugby player, 32 (killed in action at Mametz Wood, during the Somme)
12 July - Johnnie Williams, Wales international rugby player, 34 (died of wounds received at Mametz, on the Somme)
14 July - David Watts, Wales international rugby player, 30 (killed in action)
30 July - Eveline Willett Cunnington, social reformer in New Zealand, 67
3 September - Horace Thomas, Wales international rugby player, 26 (killed in action)
11 September - Thomas Lemuel James, Welsh-American banker and U.S. Postmaster-General (born 1831)
28 September (in Bath, Somerset) - Richard Thomas, industrialist, 78
7 October - Leigh Richmond Roose, footballer, 38 (killed in action)
11 October - David Richard Thomas, clergyman and historian, 83
31 October - John Rolls, 2nd Baron Llangattock, 46 (killed in action)
12 November - Sir Walter Morgan, 1st Baronet, banker and Lord Mayor of London, 85 
14 November - William Davies, footballer, 61

References

 
 Wales